Anisus is a genus of small air-breathing freshwater snails, aquatic pulmonate gastropod mollusks in the subfamily Planorbinae of the family Planorbidae, the ramshorn snails and their allies.

Species
The genus contains the following species:
Subgenus Anisus
 Anisus calculiformis (Sandberger, 1874)
  † Anisus komarovae Prysjazhnjuk, 1974
  † Anisus krambergeri (Halaváts, 1903) 
  † Anisus laskarevi Milošević, 1976 
 Anisus leucostoma (Millet, 1813)
  † Anisus septemgyratiformis (Gottschick, 1911) 
 Anisus septemgyratus (Rossmässler, 1835)
 Anisus spirorbis (Linnaeus, 1758) - the type species of the genus
 Anisus strauchianus (Clessin, 1884)
Subgenus Anisus (Costorbis) Lindholm, 1926
 † Anisus densecostatus Schütt, 1994 
Subgenus Disculifer C. Boettger 1944
 † Anisus omalus (Bourguignat, 1881)  
 Anisus vorticulus

Subgenus ?
 † Anisus angulatus (Clessin, 1877) 
 † Anisus balizacensis (Peyrot, 1932) 
 † Anisus brunnensis (Sauerzopf, 1953) 
 † Anisus confusus Soós, 1934 
 † Anisus depressissimus (Sacco, 1886) 
 † Anisus dupuyianus (Noulet, 1854) 
 † Anisus falsani (Locard, 1883) 
 † Anisus guerichi (Andreae, 1902) 
 † Anisus hilgendorfi (Fraas, 1868) 
 Anisus issykulensis (Clessin, 1907) 
 † Anisus mariae (Michaud, 1862) 
 † Anisus matheroni (Fischer & Tournouër, 1873) 
 † Anisus metochiensis Milošević, 1976 
 Anisus natalensis (Krauss)
 † Anisus rousianus (Noulet, 1854) 
 Anisus vortex (Linnaeus, 1758)
Subspecies and species brought into synonymy
 Subgenus Anisus (Gyraulus) Agassiz in Charpentier, 1837: synonym of Gyraulus Charpentier, 1837
 Anisus (Gyraulus) terekholicus Prozorova & Starobogato, 1997: synonym of Gyraulus terekholicus (Prozorova & Starobogatov, 1997) 
Subgenus † Anisus (Odontogyrorbis) Lörenthey, 1906: synonym of  Anisus (Anisus) Studer, 1820
 Subgenus Anisus (Spiralina) Martens, 1899: synonym of Anisus Studer, 1820
 † Anisus angustigyratus (Sauerzopf, 1953): synonym of † Anisus (Anisus) krambergeri (Halaváts, 1903) 
 † Anisus dupuyanus (Noulet, 1854): synonym of † Anisus dupuyianus (Noulet, 1854) 
  Anisus septemgyratus auct. (not Rossmässler): synonym of  Anisus calculiformis (Sandberger, 1874)
 Anisus tokyoensis Mori, 1938: synonym of Gyraulus tokyoensis (Mori, 1938)

References

External links 
 

Planorbidae